The index of physics articles is split into multiple pages due to its size.

To navigate by individual letter use the table of contents below.

K

K-65 residues
K-Long
K-Poincaré algebra
K-Poincaré group
K-Short
K-edge
K-factor (aerospace)
K-factor (centrifugation)
K-theory (physics)
K. R. Ramanathan
K. R. Sreenivasan
K2K experiment
K3 surface
KALI (laser)
KAMINI
KAON Factory
KARMEN
KASCADE
KAT-7
KATRIN
KEK
KEKB (accelerator)
KM3NeT
KMQ viewer
KMS state
KOALA – Quasi Laue Diffractometer
KOWARI
KSTAR
KT (energy)
K band (IEEE)
K band (infrared)
K band (NATO)
K correction
Ka band
Kadomtsev–Petviashvili equation
Kadowaki–Woods ratio
Kagome lattice
Kai-Ming Ho
Kai Puolamäki
Kai Siegbahn
Kaido Reivelt
Kalb–Ramond field
Kalina cycle
Kalliroscope
Kaluza–Klein theory
Kamaloddin Jenab
Kamioka Liquid Scintillator Antineutrino Detector
Kamioka Observatory
Kammback
Kamran Vafa
Kaon
Kaon oscillation
Kaonic hydrogen
Kaonium
Kapitsa–Dirac effect
Kaplan–Yorke map
Karatmeter
Karel Niessen
Karen Kavanagh
Karen Ter-Martirosian
Kari Enqvist
Kariamanickam Srinivasa Krishnan
Karl-Heinrich Riewe
Karl-Heinz Höcker
Karl-Henning Rehren
Karl-Otto Kiepenheuer
Karl Alexander Müller
Karl Baedeker (scientist)
Karl Bechert
Karl Eugen Guthe
Karl Ferdinand Braun
Karl Friedrich Küstner
Karl G. Kessler
Karl Glitscher
Karl Guthe Jansky
Karl Heinz Beckurts
Karl Herzfeld
Karl Ledersteger
Karl Leo
Karl Lintner
Karl Meissner
Karl Mey
Karl Scheel
Karl Schwarzschild
Karl Taylor Compton
Karl Weissenberg
Karl Wirtz
Karl Zimmer
Karol Olszewski
Kasner metric
Kasson S. Gibson
Katabatic wind
Kate Hutton
Kater's pendulum
Katharine Burr Blodgett
Katherine Freese
Katherine McAlpine
Katherine Sopka
Kathy Sykes
Kato theorem
Katsunori Wakabayashi
Kaufmann (Scully) vortex
Kautsky effect
Kauzmann paradox
Kavli Institute for Theoretical Physics
Kavli Institute of Nanoscience
Kaye effect
Kazim Ergin
Kazimierz Fajans
Kazuhiko Nishijima
Kazys Almenas
Keiiti Aki
Keith Brueckner
Keith Burnett
Keith Burton
Keith Edward Bullen
Keith Nugent
Keith Runcorn
Kelly Johnson (engineer)
Kelvin
Kelvin's circulation theorem
Kelvin-Planck statement
Kelvin material
Kelvin probe force microscope
Kelvin water dropper
Kelvin wave
Kelvin–Helmholtz instability
Kelvin–Helmholtz mechanism
Kelvin–Voigt material
Ken Pounds
Ken Riley (physicist)
Kendal Nezan
Kender engine
Kennedy–Thorndike experiment
Kenneth Allen (physicist)
Kenneth Bainbridge
Kenneth G. Libbrecht
Kenneth G. Wilson
Kenneth H. Hunt
Kenneth Lane (physicist)
Kenneth M. Baird
Kenneth Mees
Kenneth Nordtvedt
Kenneth Ross MacKenzie
Kenneth Stewart Cole
Kepler's laws of planetary motion
Kepler orbit
Kepler problem
Keplerian problem
Kerma (physics)
Kern arc
Kerr-lens modelocking
Kerr Grant
Kerr cell shutter
Kerr effect
Kerr metric
Kerr–Newman metric
Kerson Huang
Keulegan–Carpenter number
Kharkiv Theoretical Physics School
Khālid ibn ʿAbd al‐Malik al‐Marwarrūdhī
Kibble balance
Kiel probe
Killing horizon
Killing spinor
Kilogram
Kilogram per cubic metre
Kilometre
Kim Maltman
Kim Sung-Hou
Kim Weaver
Kinematic diagram
Kinematic pair
Kinematics
Kinetic Monte Carlo
Kinetic energy
Kinetic inductance
Kinetic inductance detector
Kinetic momentum
Kinetic term
Kinetic theory
Kinetics (physics)
Kingdon trap
Kip Siegel
Kip Thorne
Kirchhoff's circuit laws
Kirchhoff's diffraction formula
Kirchhoff's law of thermal radiation
Kirchhoff equations
Kirpal Nandra
Kirstine Meyer
Kite types
Kjell Henriksen
Klara Döpel
Klaus Blaum
Klaus Fesser
Klaus Fuchs
Klaus Kern
Klaus von Klitzing
Kleemenko cycle
Klein paradox
Klein transformation
Klein–Gordon equation
Klemperer rosette
Klystron
Klystron tube
Knapp's rule
Knight shift
Knudsen cell
Knudsen diffusion
Knudsen equation
Knudsen flow
Knudsen gas
Knudsen layer
Knudsen number
Knut Ångström
Kochen–Specker theorem
Kodama state
Koenig's manometric flame apparatus
Kogut–Susskind fermion
Kohn anomaly
Kohn effect
Kohn–Sham equations
Koide formula
Kolmogorov–Arnold–Moser theorem
Komar mass
Kondo effect
Konishi anomaly
Konrad Beyerle
Konrad Bleuler
Konrad Dannenberg
Konstantin Novoselov
Konstanty Zakrzewski
Kopp's law
Korringa–Kohn–Rostoker approximation
Kort nozzle
Korteweg–de Vries equation
Kossel
Kosterlitz–Thouless transition
Kozeny–Carman equation
Kramers' law
Kramers theorem
Kramers–Heisenberg formula
Kramers–Kronig relations
Kramers–Wannier duality
Krasovskii–LaSalle principle
Kratos MS 50
Kreft's dichromaticity index
Kretschmann scalar
Kristian Birkeland
Kristian Fossheim
Kronig–Penney model
Krueger flaps
Kruskal–Szekeres coordinates
Krylov–Bogolyubov theorem
Krypton fluoride laser
Kröger–Vink notation
Ku band
Kugelblitz (astrophysics)
Kugel–Khomskii coupling
Kullback–Leibler divergence
Kundt's tube
Kuramoto model
Kurchatov Medal
Kurd von Mosengeil
Kurt Binder
Kurt Diebner
Kurt Gottfried
Kurt Lehovec
Kurt Mendelssohn
Kurt Symanzik
Kurt Wiesenfeld
Kutta condition
Kutta–Joukowski theorem
Kuznetsov NK-14
Kuzyk quantum gap
Kyong Wonha
Kyriakos Tamvakis
K·p perturbation theory
Kármán line
Kármán vortex street
Kármán–Howarth equation
Källén–Lehmann spectral representation
Köhler theory
König's theorem (kinetics)
Küssner effect

Indexes of physics articles